Neville Miller (27 August 1874 – 3 March 1967) was an English cricketer. He played nine first-class matches for Surrey between 1899 and 1903. In 1899, he scored 124 runs on first-class debut, a record for Surrey that stood until Jamie Smith scored 127 on debut in March 2019.

See also
 List of Surrey County Cricket Club players

References

External links
 

1874 births
1967 deaths
English cricketers
Surrey cricketers
Sportspeople from Shanghai
British expatriates in China